Spodoptera apertura is a moth of the family Noctuidae first described by Francis Walker in 1865. It is known from China, India, Sri Lanka, South Africa, Madagascar and Australia.

References

Spodoptera
Moths of Madagascar
Moths of Africa
Moths described in 1865